The David Castillo Gallery is an art gallery in Miami Beach, Florida. It was opened by David Castillo in 2005.

The gallery has participated in art fairs including Art Basel Miami Beach and The Armory Show.

Time magazine listed it as one of "10 things to do in 24 hours" in Miami. In 2008, the Miami New Times voted it "Best Gallery".

References

Castillo, David
Art museums and galleries in Florida
Art galleries established in 2005
2005 establishments in Florida